Kitsap Lake is an unincorporated community and census-designated place (CDP) in Kitsap County, Washington, United States. As of the 2020 census, it had a population of 1,997. Prior to 2020, it was part of the Erlands Point-Kitsap Lake CDP.

The Kitsap Lake CDP is in the center of the county, bordered to the south and east by the city of Bremerton, to the northeast by Erlands Point, and to the north by Chico. The CDP is in the valley of Kitsap Creek, north of (downstream from) Kitsap Lake, a water body that is within the Bremerton city limits.

References 

Populated places in Kitsap County, Washington
Census-designated places in Kitsap County, Washington
Census-designated places in Washington (state)